Mlali is an administrative ward in the Kongwa district of the Dodoma Region of Tanzania. According to the 2002 census, the ward has a total population of 27,460.

In Mlali, a Rehabilitation center operates that treats orthopaedic diseases of children; also other medical specialities are practiced, like dentistry by volunteers of Smile Mission.

References

Wards of Dodoma Region